Monsters Exist is the ninth studio album by Orbital, released on 14 September 2018 through their own ACP label. It is their first studio album in six years (their last studio album Wonky was released in 2012) and the first since they reformed for the second time in 2017.  The title is shown in the earlier video for "The Box" in 1996 when Tilda Swinton glances at an array of TV screens.

Critical reception

The album received generally positive reception, with a score of 67 out of 100 based on nine reviews on Metacritic.

Track listing

Charts

References

2018 albums
Orbital (band) albums